Taisia Mykolaivna Povaliy (born 10 December 1964) is a Ukrainian singer and actress.

She started her career of singer in 1985. In 1993, she won the Grand Prix at the Slavianski Bazaar in Vitebsk, Belarus.

In 1995, she released her first album. The next year she was awarded the honorary title of Merited Artist of Ukraine. In 1997, she was awarded the title of People's Artist of Ukraine. In 1998, she was awarded the Order of Saint Nicholas Thaumaturgus (International).

Personal life
From 1982 to 1993, she was married to keyboardist Volodymyr Povaliy (born 6 June 1959), who worked in the Kyiv Music Hall as the artistic director of the singer Ivo Bobul's musical group, made backing tracks for Zhanna Bodnaruk, Vitalii Bilonozhko, Alla Kudlai and Taisia Povaliy, now he works as an arranger in the presidential orchestra. In this marriage, a son Denis Povaliy was born on 28 June 1983. In 1993, the marriage ended in divorce.

Since 31 December 1993, Taisia has been married for the second time to musician and producer Igor Likhuta (born 11 April 1961).

Political views
Povaliy was a candidate for Party of Regions at the October 2012 Ukrainian parliamentary election; placed second on the party list She was elected into parliament. She left the Party of Regions parliamentarian faction on 3 June 2014. Povaliy did not participate in the 2014 Ukrainian parliamentary election.

In 2015 Ukrainian parliament made a decree to remove her as Ukrainian National Singer because she does concerts in Russia. In September 2022, the National Security and Defense Council of Ukraine added Taisia Povaliy to the sanctions list.  During the 2023 New Years celebrations, Povaliy sang a traditional Ukrainian song on Russian state TV, which led her to being branded "shameless" and a "traitor" by many Ukrainians.

In February 2023, Povaliy stated that she supported Vladimir Putin's policy in Ukraine and called it "salvation". Povaliy also confirmed that she has been living in Russia since 2022.

Discography

Studio albums
 Panno kokhannia (1995)
 Ya vas liubliu (1997)
 Sladkiy grekh (1999)
 Bude tak (2000)
 Odna-Yedyna (with Joseph Kobzon; 2002)
 Ptitsa volnaya (2002)
 Ukrainski pisenni perlyny (2002)
 Serdenko (2004)
 Za toboy (2007)
 Veryu tebe (2010)
 Serdtse – dom dlya lyubvi (2018)
 Eiforiia (2020)
 Osobennye slova. Ispoved (2021)

Live albums 
 Ukraina. Golos. Dusha (2008)

Compilations albums 
 Chortopolokh (2001)
 Charivna skrypka (2002)
 Vozvrashchayu (2003)
 Nakazany lyubovyu (2008)
 Ya pomoljus''' (2012)
 Dve zvezdy (with Aleksandr Marshal; 2012)
 Osobennye slova (2020)

 EPs 
 Otpusti menya'' (with Nikolay Baskov; 2004)

Filmography

Notes

References

External links
Taisia Povaliy website
International fan-club of Taisia Povaliy 

1965 births
People from Kyiv Oblast
Living people
Ukrainian women singers
Ukrainian television actresses
Ukrainian pop singers
Party of Regions politicians
20th-century Ukrainian actresses
21st-century Ukrainian actresses
Seventh convocation members of the Verkhovna Rada
Ukrainian folk-pop singers
Slavianski Bazaar winners
Winners of the Golden Gramophone Award